Shade of the Tree is a novel by Piers Anthony published in 1986.

Plot summary
Shade of the Tree is a novel in which a rustic horror story involves a ghost.

Reception
Dave Langford reviewed Shade of the Tree for White Dwarf #98, and stated that "From Anthony we'd also expect a tidy ending, resolving problems with that inhuman fairness so often found in fairy tales [...] the Tree responsible for interminable forebodings and sinister hallucinations is converted to niceness by a spot of telepathic computer systems analysis."

Reviews
Review by Alexander Butrym (1986) in Fantasy Review, April 1986
Review by Debbie Notkin (1986) in Locus, #305 June 1986
Review by Don D'Ammassa (1986) in Science Fiction Chronicle, #85 October 1986
Review by Ken Brown (1988) in Interzone, #24 Summer 1988

References

1986 novels